The Pays d'en Haut (Upper Country) was a territory of New France covering the regions of North America located west of Montreal. The vast territory included most of the Great Lakes region, expanding west and south over time into the North American continent as the French had explored. The Pays d'en Haut was established in 1610 and dependent upon the colony of Canada until 1763, when the Treaty of Paris ended New France, and both were ceded to the British as the Province of Quebec.

History
Sainte-Marie among the Hurons was established in 1639 by the French, their first mission north of the Great Lakes, along the eastern shore of Lake Huron. Following the destruction of the Huron homeland in 1649 by the Iroquois, the French missionaries returned to Canada with the remaining Hurons, who established themselves in Wendake.

By 1660, France started a policy of expansion into the interior of North America from Canada, with the objectives to locate a Northwest Passage to China, to exploit the territory's natural resources, such as fur and mineral ores, and to convert the native population to Catholicism. Fur traders began exploring the pays d'en haut, the "upper country" around the Great Lakes at the time. In 1659, Pierre-Esprit Radisson and Médard Chouart des Groseilliers reached the western end of Lake Superior, where priests founded missions, such as the Mission of Sault Sainte Marie in 1668. In 1671, Father Jacques Marquette established a French mission at Michilimackinac that would over the next half century become a waypoint for exploration, a place for diplomatic relations with natives, and a commercial center for fur trade. On 17 May 1673, Louis Jolliet and Jacques Marquette began the exploration of the Mississippi River, which they called the Sioux Tongo (the large river) or Michissipi. They reached the mouth of the Arkansas River, and then returned upstream, having learned that the great river ran towards the Gulf of Mexico and not towards the Pacific Ocean as they had presumed.

Northern expansion
In what are today Ontario, part of Minnesota and the eastern Prairies, various trading posts and forts were built such as Fort Kaministiquia (1679), Fort Frontenac (1673), Fort Saint Pierre (1731), Fort Saint Charles (1732) and Fort Rouillé (1750).

Southern expansion
In 1701, Antoine Laumet de La Mothe founded Fort Pontchartrain du Détroit, which became the center of French military presence in the region. Other forts in the area strengthened the network; these included Fort Niagara (1678), Fort Crevecoeur (1680), Fort de Buade (1683), Fort Saint-Louis du Rocher (1683), Fort Saint Antoine (1686), Fort Saint-Joseph (1691), Fort Michilimackinac (1715), Fort Miami (1715), Fort La Baye (1717), Fort Ouiatenon (1717), Fort Chagouamigon (1718), and Fort Beauharnois (1727). These forts provided French sovereignty in the area and facilitated commerce with the natives. In 1717, southern areas nearer the Mississippi River known as the Illinois Country were transferred from Canada to Louisiana, a colony of France south at the mouth of the river.

Settlements
The French settlements in the Pays d'en Haut south of the Great Lakes were Detroit, La Baye, Sault Sainte-Marie, Saint Ignace, and Vincennes. Vincennes was later attached to Pays des Illinois, which was part of Louisiana. By 1773, the population of Detroit was 1,400. By 1778, its population was up to 2,144.

Protecting the Pays d'en Haut were four forts: Fort Presque Isle (1753), Fort Le Boeuf (1753), Fort Duquesne (1754), and Fort Machault (1754).

Recent terminology
Today, the term Les Pays-d'en-Haut refers to a regional county municipality in the Laurentides region of Quebec, north of Montreal. It is the traditional name of a larger area in the hills northwest of Montréal, centred on upper portions of Rivière du Nord (Laurentides) river. Its settlements were founded well after the original meaning of the name had become obsolete. The series Les Belles Histoires des pays d'en haut takes place in that area.

See also

 New France
 Military of New France
 Historic regions of the United States
 List of French forts in North America
 Upper Canada

References

Further reading 
 

New France
History of the Midwestern United States
History of Ontario by location
1610 establishments in the French colonial empire
Colonial United States (French)
French North America
Franco-Ontarian history